Liverpool, Walton is a constituency represented in the House of Commons of the UK Parliament since 2017 by Dan Carden of the Labour Party. Carden won the highest percentage share of the vote in June 2017 of 650 constituencies, 85.7%. It is the safest Labour seat in the United Kingdom, and the safest seat in the country having been won by 85% of the vote in the most recent election in 2019.

Boundaries

1918–1950: The County Borough of Liverpool wards of Fazakerley, Walton, and Warbreck.

1950–1955: As above plus the civil parish of Aintree in the Rural District of West Lancashire.

1955–1983: The County Borough of Liverpool wards of County, Fazakerley, Pirrie, and Warbreck.

1983–2010: The City of Liverpool wards of Anfield, Breckfield, County, Fazakerley, Melrose, and Warbreck.

2010–present: The City of Liverpool wards of Anfield, Clubmoor, County, Everton, Fazakerley, and Warbreck.

The constituency is one of five covering the city of Liverpool and covers the north-centre of the city thereby taking in Walton, Clubmoor, Orrell Park, Anfield, Everton and Fazakerley. The grounds of Liverpool F.C. (Anfield) and Everton F.C. (Goodison Park), the city's two major football clubs, are in the constituency.

History
Created by the Redistribution of Seats Act 1885, Liverpool Walton has been held by the Labour Party since the 1964 general election, and is the party's safest seat by size of majority. In 2010 and 2015, it had the largest Labour majority in the country by percentage terms. Labour won over 70% of the vote at every general election in the Walton constituency since 1992, although for many years; it was looked on as a reasonably safe Conservative seat. Until 1964, Labour had only gained Walton once, at their landslide victory after the Second World War ended in 1945. Like other seats in Merseyside, the Conservative Party's share of the vote declined rapidly during the 1980s, and Conservative candidates failed to poll in second place from 1997 until 2017. From 1964 until his death in 1991, the seat was held by the notable left-winger Eric Heffer; the subsequent by-election was won by Peter Kilfoyle, who held the seat until 2010. Steve Rotheram won the seat in 2010 after Kilfoyle stood down.

At both the 2010 and 2015 general elections, Liverpool Walton saw the highest share of the vote for a winning candidate in the country, and in the latter election, the 81.3% of the vote won by Rotheram was the highest of any candidate in an election in the UK since 1997.

In 2015, Liverpool Walton was the only constituency in England where the Conservative candidate (Norsheen Bhatti) lost their deposit.

In the 2016 referendum on EU membership, the constituency is estimated to have voted by a 7.6% majority in favour of leaving the EU in contrast to Rotheram, who supported remaining in the EU. The Leave percentage vote was 53.8%. However, an analysis of YouGov polling by Focaldata suggested support for Remain had risen from 46.2% to 60.5% in August 2018.

Rotheram stood down as an MP at the 2017 general election due to his election as Mayor of the Liverpool City Region and was succeeded as the Labour candidate by Dan Carden, who won the seat with the highest vote share for any Labour candidate nationally, at 85.7% – the strongest result in the seat's history.

Members of Parliament

Elections

Elections in the 2010s

In percentage terms, Carden's vote share and majority were unmatched by any candidate in any constituency at the 2019 election, although higher turnouts and larger electorates saw fifteen other MPs — twelve Labour in London and one in Merseyside, and three Conservatives in Lincolnshire and Essex — win with bigger numerical majorities.

Elections in the 2000s

Elections in the 1990s

Elections in the 1980s

Elections in the 1970s

Elections in the 1960s

Elections in the 1950s

Elections in the 1940s

Elections in the 1930s

Election results 1885–1929

Elections in the 1880s
 

Gibson was appointed Solicitor-General for Ireland, requiring a by-election.

Gibson resigned after being appointed a Judge of the Queen's Bench Division in the High Court of Justice in Ireland, causing a by-election.

Elections in the 1890s

Elections in the 1900s

Elections in the 1910s

General Election 1914–15:

Another General Election was required to take place before the end of 1915. The political parties had been making preparations for an election to take place and by July 1914, the following candidates had been selected; 
Unionist: F. E. Smith
Liberal: Thomas Berridge

Elections in the 1920s

See also
List of parliamentary constituencies in Merseyside

Notes

References

External links 
Liverpool Street Gallery - Liverpool 4
Liverpool Street Gallery - Liverpool 9

Parliamentary constituencies in North West England
Walton
Constituencies of the Parliament of the United Kingdom established in 1885